Joanna Zofia Frydrych (born 13 January 1978) is a Polish politician. She was elected to the Sejm in 2015 and 2019.

References

1978 births
Living people
Members of the Polish Sejm 2019–2023
Members of the Polish Sejm 2015–2019
Civic Platform politicians
People from Krosno